The Surinamese National Badminton Championships is a tournament organized by the Surinaamse Badminton Bond (SBB) the governing body for the sport of badminton in Suriname, to crown the best badminton players in Suriname.

The tournament started in 1966 and is held every year, except for the years 1971, 1986, 1989, 2002 and 2007 when no National championships were held. Since the year 2000 the National Championships of Suriname is divided between Category A for elite players and Category B for recreational players. Furthermore a National Junior Championships is also organized every year. There also used to be yearly Surinamese National Badminton Club Championships for club teams held since 1964.

Past winners National Championships Category A

External links
http://www.dbnl.org/tekst/stut004eers01_01/stut004eers01_01.pdf

References

National badminton championships
Recurring sporting events established in 1966
Badminton tournaments in Suriname